Lying: Moral Choice in Public and Private Life is a 1978 book by philosopher Sissela Bok that covers the ethical issues in lying, such as intent, result, context, and circumstances. It was published by Pantheon Books.

References

Further reading

External links 
 

1978 non-fiction books
Ethics books
Lying
Pantheon Books books
English-language books